Jerusalem in My Heart (JIMH) is a live audio-visual performance project, with Montréal-based producer and musician Radwan Ghazi Moumneh (co-owner of The Hotel2Tango recording studio in Montreal) and Montréal-based filmmaker Erin Weisgerber. Jerusalem in My Heart release their music on Montreal label Constellation Records.

Band history
Since 2013, JIMH have released four studio albums, Mo7it Al-Mo7it (2013), If He Dies, If If If If If If (2015), Daqa'iq Tudaiq (2018), Qalaq (2021) and a self-titled album with Suuns, released on Secretly Canadian. In 2016 Moumneh scored 6 of the 8 songs featured in Deserts (co-directed by Coderre). Jerusalem in My Heart curated some of the 2017 edition of the Le Guess Who? festival in Utrecht.

Discography
 Mo7it Al-Mo7it (2013, Constellation Records)
 If He Dies, If If If If If If (2015, Constellation Records)
 Suuns and Jerusalem in My Heart (2015, Secretly Canadian, Secret City Records])
 Daqa'iq Tudaiq (2018, Constellation Records)
 Qalaq (2021, Constellation Records)

References

External links
 Jerusalem in My Heart

Musical groups established in 2005
Musical groups from Montreal
2005 establishments in Quebec
Canadian experimental musical groups